Uffe may refer to:

 Uffe (given name), a list of people with the given name
 Klettenberger Mühlgraben, formerly also called Uffe, a river of Thuringia, Germany
 Uffe (Wieda), a river of Lower Saxony and Thuringia, Germany